Enrique Milton Almada Cavo (15 July 1934, in Montevideo – 29 April 1990), also known as Quique Almada, was a Uruguayan actor and comedian.

In the 1960s he started a long career on television. Together with a notable group of Uruguayan humorists (Eduardo D'Angelo, Ricardo Espalter, Julio Frade, Raimundo Soto), he was part of several successful humor programs: Telecataplúm (1962), Jaujarana (1969–1972), Hupumorpo (1974–1977), Comicolor (1980–1984), Híperhumor (1984–1989), Decalegrón (1977–2002).

In 1990 he died of cancer. The Uruguayan Senate held a solemn session in his honor.

References

External links
 

1934 births
1990 deaths
Uruguayan people of Portuguese descent
20th-century Uruguayan male actors
Uruguayan male comedians
Deaths from cancer in Uruguay
Male actors from Montevideo
Uruguayan male television actors
20th-century comedians